Han Na-lae and Jang Su-jeong were the defending champions, but both players chose not to participate.

Xun Fangying and You Xiaodi won the title, defeating Akgul Amanmuradova and Michaela Hončová in the final, 1–6, 6–2, [10–7].

Seeds

Draw

References 
 Draw

Jinyuan Cup - Doubles